General Bipin Chandra Joshi, PVSM, AVSM, ADC (5 December 1935 – 19 November 1994) was the 17th Chief of Army Staff (COAS) of the Indian Army. He is the only Chief of the Indian Army to die in office, and until the 2021 death of General Bipin Rawat in a helicopter crash, the only full general and serving Chairman of the Chiefs of Staff Committee to have died in office.

Early life
Joshi was born in a Hindu Kumaoni Brahmin family. The time he became Army Chief, Pithoragarh & Almora were  parts of Uttar Pradesh. He was the first Army Chief  from Uttar Pradesh (Pithoragarh, Uttarakhand was a part of erstwhile Uttar Pradesh). Today Pithoragarh district falls within the borders of Uttarakhand.

Career 
Commissioned 4 December 1954 into  2nd Lancers (Gardner's Horse), Indian Army Armoured Corps.
Commanded an armoured regiment in the Western Sector during the 1971 Indo-Pak operations. He also commanded an Independent Armoured Brigade and an Infantry Division.
Military Advisor in Australia from May 1973 to October 1976
Staff officer in the UN Force in  Gaza
Brigadier General Staff in a Corps Headquarters
Commanded a Corps in the Eastern Sector
General Officer Commanding-in-Chief, Southern Command.
Additional Director General of Perspective Planning (ADG PP) & Director General Military Operations (DGMO) at the Army Headquarters
Three tenures as an instructor in the Armoured Corps Centre and School, Ahmednagar
Directed Staff in the College of Combat, Mhow
Established the Army Institute of Technology in Pune (Engineering College), Maharashtra in August 1994 for the wards of defence personnel, either in service or retired.

Joshi also became Colonel_(India)#Colonel_of_the_regiment of the 64 Cavalry later in his career.

Medals
Joshi has been a recipient of the Param Vishisht Seva Medal, Ati Vishisht Seva Medal for distinguished service of the most exceptional order.

Death 
Joshi died of a cardiac arrest in New Delhi Military Hospital on 18 November 1994. He was due to retire in 1995. He was the first Chief of Indian Army who died in harness. General Bipin Rawat, former Chief and the serving Chief of Defence Staff, also died in a tragic helicopter crash in December 2021 whilst landing at the Defence Services Staff College in Wellington. General Joshi’s untimely death changed the entire line of succession for the post of Chief of Army Staff, which is typically decided on the basis of seniority. As a result, Lt. Gen. Shankar Roychoudhary was promoted to full general and appointed as the 17th Chief of Army Staff.

Legacy
The Gen. B. C. Joshi Army Public School was established in 1993 in Pithoragarh, Uttarakhand in his honour.

Honours and decorations

Dates of rank

References

External links
 Book titled Man, culture, and society in the Kumaun Himalayas: General B. C. Joshi commemoration volume - includes brief articles on General B. C. Joshi
 https://www.nytimes.com/1994/11/19/obituaries/gen-bipin-chandra-joshi-indian-army-chief-59.html
 http://www.timescontent.com/tss/showcase/preview-buy/29780/News/General-Bipin-Chandra-Joshi.html

1935 births
1994 deaths
Kumaoni people
Military personnel from Uttarakhand
People from Pithoragarh
Chiefs of Army Staff (India)
Indian generals
Recipients of the Param Vishisht Seva Medal
Recipients of the Ati Vishisht Seva Medal
Defence Services Staff College alumni